Suhren is a German surname.  Notable people with the surname include:

Fritz Suhren (1908–1950), German SS Nazi concentration camp commandant executed for war crimes
Reinhard Suhren (1916–1984), German U-boat commander during World War II, brother of Gerd Suhren
Wilhelm Suhren (born 1927), German former field hockey player

German-language surnames